Favor or Favour, (see spelling differences) also favors may refer to:

People
 Donald Favor (1913–1984), American hammer thrower
 Edward M. Favor (1856–1936), American singer and vaudeville comedian
 Mike Favor (born 1966), American football player
 Suzy Favor Hamilton (born 1968), American professional middle-distance runner
 Derrick Favors (born 1991), American basketball player
 Floyd Favors (born 1963), retired boxer from the United States
 Greg Favors (born 1974), former American football linebacker
 JoAnne Favors (born 1942), American politician
 Malachi Favors (1927–2004), American jazz bassist
 John Favour (died 1624), Church of England divine

Arts, entertainment, and media

Films
 The Favor (1994 film), an American romantic comedy directed by Donald Petrie
 The Favor (2006 film), a drama by Eva S. Aridjis

Television
 "Favors" (Mad Men), a television episode
 Grace & Favour, BBC sitcom
 "The Favor" (Brooklyn Nine-Nine), a television episode

Music
 "Favor" (Lonny Bereal song), 2011
 "Favor" (Vindata, Skrillex and NSTASIA song), 2017
 The Favours, four-piece Indie rock band from Kingston upon Hull, England

Other uses
 Favor Delivery, a delivery company based in Austin, Texas
 Favor Peak, a mountain in Alaska
 Party favor, a small gift given to the guests at a party or wedding reception

See also
 Favorit (disambiguation)
 Favorite (disambiguation)
 Favorlang language, an extinct Formosan language closely related to Babuza
 In-group favoritism, favoring members of one's own group
 Party Favor (disambiguation)